Blera umbratilis, the Hairy Wood Fly, is an uncommon species of syrphid fly first officially described by Williston in 1887. Hoverflies get their names from the ability to remain nearly motionless while in flight. The adults are also known as flower flies for they are commonly found around and on flowers, from which they get both energy-giving nectar and protein-rich pollen. The larvae are of the rat-tailed type, feeding on exuding sap or in the rot holes of trees.

Distribution
This is a Nearctic species  of the eastern and central areas of the United States.
 External map

Description
For terms see Morphology of Diptera.
External images 

Size 10mm.

Head
The  front is broader above than in the preceding species, mostly shining, with rather long yellowish pile; The face is black, thickly dusted with white on the sides, and with a bare black median stripe vitta and the cheeks shining.  The face is considerably excavated below, produced downward and somewhat forwards. The antennae reddish-brown, and the flagellum is orbicular. The frontal prominence is relatively small, The occiput is black, with yellowish pile and gray pollen.
Thorax
The dorsum of  the thorax, scutum and Blera postpronotum are, shining black, with rather abundant, obscurely yellow pile. The pile is  black across the middle. The scutellum and pleura are black with yellow pile. 
Abdomen
The abdomen is short, oval; black, shining, with short black pile. The sides of the second segment are broadly orange yellow. The third segment is less broadly orange-yellow and  the fourth segment is narrowly orange-yellow. The  black ground color is, however, almost wholly obscured by thick woolly orange yellow pile, extending less broadly on the sides of the third segment, and narrowly on the margin of the fourth. The pile of the second segment in the middle is short yellow.
Wing  
The wings are somewhat brownish, a little lighter at the base. There is a darker cloud near the fork of the  second (R2+3 ) and third veins (R4+5 ). The  vein R4+5 is almost straight and joins the costa just before the tip of the wing. The first posterior cell R4+5  is acute apically and  extends almost to the wing margin before the tip.
Legs
The legs  are black, with yellowish white pile. The base of middle femora and basal two-thirds of hind femora  are yellow.  The basal end of  front and middle tibiae and all the tarsi, except the last two joints and hind metatarsi are yellow.

References

Eristalinae
Insects described in 1882
Diptera of North America

Hoverflies of North America
Taxa named by Samuel Wendell Williston